William Lowell Hill (October 17, 1855 – August 2, 1922) was a United States Navy officer and a recipient of the United States military's highest decoration, the Medal of Honor. He was awarded the medal as an enlisted sailor for rescuing a drowning shipmate in 1881. Hill went on to serve in the Spanish–American War and reached the warrant officer rank of chief boatswain. His lifelong Navy career finished with his command of two prison ships at Portsmouth Naval Shipyard.

Biography
Hill was born on October 17, 1855, in Auburn, Iowa, the son of Henry Clay and Margaret (Cater) Hill. He enlisted in the Navy from New York on November 18, 1873.

By June 22, 1881, he was serving as a captain of the top on the training ship . On that day, while Minnesota was at Newport, Rhode Island, Third Class Boy William Mulcahy fell overboard. Hill jumped into the water and kept the sailor afloat until they were picked up by a launch.

For this action, he was promoted to the warrant officer rank of boatswain on 19 September 1881.  He was awarded the Medal of Honor three years later, on October 18, 1884.

Hill's official Medal of Honor citation reads:
Serving on board the U.S. Training Ship Minnesota at Newport, R.I., 22 June 1881, Hill jumped overboard and sustained William Mulcahy, third class boy, who had fallen overboard, until picked up by a steam launch.

During the Spanish–American War, he served on Brooklyn at the warrant officer rank of boatswain and received a commendation from Rear Admiral Winfield Scott Schley for his actions at the Battle of Santiago de Cuba. A year later, in 1899, he was promoted to chief warrant officer. In 1901 he testified before a court of inquiry regarding Admiral Schley's conduct in the war.

He became known for his prison reform measures, such as discontinuing the use of leg irons, which were adopted at other institutions.

Hill's first wife was F. Blanche Hedden of Troy, New York, whom he married in 1881. After Blanche's death, he married Katherine Sweetser on February 3, 1917; she had been his first wife's best friend. He was an active freemason while living in Portsmouth, joining a lodge there in 1905.

During the First World War, Hill was promoted to the temporary rank of lieutenant on July 1, 1918.  He was assigned to the Portsmouth Naval Shipyard.  He retired from the Navy on October 17, 1919, having reached the mandatory retirement age of 64.

Lieutenant Hill was a Compatriot of the Empire State Society of the Sons of the American Revolution and was assigned state compatriot number 266 and national compatriot number 4,266.

Hill committed suicide at age 66 on August 2, 1922, at the Portsmouth Naval Shipyard. He was buried at Lindenwood Cemetery in Stoneham, Massachusetts.

Awards
Medal of Honor
Sampson Medal
Spanish Campaign Medal
Victory Medal

See also

List of Medal of Honor recipients during peacetime

References

External links

1855 births
1922 deaths
People from Sac County, Iowa
United States Navy officers
United States Navy Medal of Honor recipients
American military personnel of the Spanish–American War
American military personnel who committed suicide
Non-combat recipients of the Medal of Honor
People from Portsmouth, New Hampshire
Military personnel from Iowa